The seventh season of New Zealand reality television series The Block NZ, titled The Block NZ: On Point, premiered on 8 July 2018. It is set in the Auckland suburb of Hobsonville Point.

The judges are Kristina Rapley, editor of Your Home and Garden Magazine, and Jason Bonham, who has been the judge on two previous seasons.

Contestants
The teams selected for this season are as follows:

Score history
The prize for winning room reveal is $5,000 cash.

Challenges

Team Judging 
The prize for team judging was $2,000 cash.

Auction

References

2018 New Zealand television seasons